The Municipality of Gornji Grad is a municipality in Slovenia. The seat of the municipality is the town of Gornji Grad. It lies on the Dreta River in the foothills of the Savinja Alps. Traditionally it belonged to the region of Styria and it is now included in the Savinja Statistical Region.

Settlements
In addition to the municipal seat of Gornji Grad, the municipality also includes the following settlements:
 Bočna
 Dol
 Florjan pri Gornjem Gradu
 Lenart pri Gornjem Gradu
 Nova Štifta

References

External links

Municipality of Gornji Grad on Geopedia
 Gornji Grad municipal site 

 
1994 establishments in Slovenia
Gornji Grad